Estrella Eleanor Carothers (4 December 1882 – 1957), known primarily as Eleanor Carothers, was an American zoologist, geneticist, and cytologist known for her work with grasshoppers. She discovered important physical evidence for the concept of independent assortment, vital to modern understanding of genetics.

Early life and education 
Carothers was born on December 4, 1883, in Newton, Kansas to Z. W. Carothers and Mary Bates. She studied at the Nickerson Normal College and went on to earn her Bachelor of Arts degree and her Master's degree from the University of Kansas, in 1911 and 1912 respectively.

Research career 
She began her career as a Pepper Fellow at Pennsylvania State University, where she stayed from 1913 to 1914. That year, she was appointed an assistant professor of zoology there, and graduated with her Ph.D. in 1916. Carothers stayed on as assistant professor until 1936, though she also had an overlapping appointment as an independent investigator for the Marine Biological Laboratory, which lasted from 1920 until 1941. In 1936 she moved to the University of Iowa and was a research associate there until 1941. Her work there was funded by the Rockefeller Foundation.

While studying and teaching at the University of Pennsylvania, Carothers traveled to the southern and southwestern regions of the United States on research expeditions, held in 1915 and 1919. During her time at the University of Iowa, she completed her most important work, in the field of genetics and cytology, using grasshopper embryos to study the independent assortment of heteromorphic homologous chromosomes. This was the first physical evidence that homologous chromosomes separated independently during meiosis, which is one source of genetic variation in sexually-reproducing organisms.

Later life 

Carothers retired from the University of Iowa in 1941 and moved from Iowa to Kingman, Kansas, where she continued to conduct research for the Woods Hole Marine Biological Lab. In 1954, she moved to Murdock, Kansas, where she lived and researched for the remainder of her life. Carothers died in 1957 at the age of 75.

Awards and honors 
In 1921, Carothers was awarded the Ellen Richards Research Prize by the Naples Table Association. She received a starred entry for her work on grasshopper embryos in the fourth edition of American Men of Science, published in 1927, a rare and significant award  for a female scientist at the time. Carothers was also elected to the National Academy of Sciences and the Academy of Natural Sciences of Philadelphia.

Major publications

Further reading

References 

American geneticists
20th-century American zoologists
Women zoologists
1882 births
1957 deaths
20th-century American women scientists
People from Newton, Kansas
People from Kingman, Kansas
People from Kingman County, Kansas